Marcos Noel Méndez Dávila (born 6 February 1986) is a Nicaraguan professional midfielder currently playing for Managua.

Club career
Méndez started his career at hometown club Masatepe and played for Diriangén before moving on to Managua in 2011.

International career
Méndez made his debut for Nicaragua in a May 2011 friendly match against Cuba and has, as of December 2013, earned a total of 8 caps, scoring no goals. He has represented his country in 2 FIFA World Cup qualification matches.

References

External links
 
 

1986 births
Living people
People from Masaya Department
Association football midfielders
Nicaraguan men's footballers
Nicaragua international footballers
Diriangén FC players
Managua F.C. players